The following highways are numbered 661:

Canada

United States